Ashraf Sobhy (born 14 April 1968) is the current Egyptian Minister of Youth and Sports, and a professor of Sports Department at Helwan University.

Ashraf Sobhi was assigned to work as an assistant to the Minister of Youth and Sports in the government of Ibrahim Mahlab since August 2014 until March 2016, but he submitted his resignation without reasons. On June 14, 2018, Sobhi was appointed Minister of Youth and Sports in the government of Mostafa Madbouly.

Education 
Sobhi holds the following degrees:
 Bachelor of Physical Education from the Faculty of Physical Education at Helwan University.
 Master in Sports Public Relations from Helwan University. - 1994
 Ph.D. in Sports Administration from Helwan University  and Iowa University as well- 2000.

Sport career 
Sobhy played Karate and won the Karate Republic Championship.

References

 

1968 births
Helwan University alumni
Living people
Egyptian Muslims
Youth ministers of Egypt
Sports ministers of Egypt
21st-century Egyptian politicians